Alban Köhler (1 March 1874 – 26 February 1947) was a German radiologist best known for his discovery of a rare foot disorder found in children that was named Köhler disease in his honor.

Early life and education 
Köhler was born on 1 March 1874 in Petsa, Thuringia.  He studied medicine in Freiburg, Erlangen, and Berlin, graduating in 1899.  He then went on to three years of surgical practice at St. Joseph's Hospital in Wiesbaden.

Career in radiology 
In 1902, Köhler established himself as a radiologist.

Death 
Köhler died on 26 February 1947 in Wiesbaden.

References

External links
Alban Köhler - whonamedit.com

German radiologists
1874 births
1947 deaths